'Mangat Mangat is a town in mandibahauddin District Delhi
 Mangat, Pakistan, a town in Mandi Bahauddin District
 Mangat clan, a Jatt clan
 Mangat Singh, A great Designer
mangat ( pronounced as माँगट) is a village in Punjab (near ludhiana);
 mangat, also a jatt clan in punjab.